Fra' Bonaventura Bisi (9 October 1601 – 5 December 1659) was an Italian painter of the Baroque period. He was also called Il Pittorino or Padre Pittorini, as a Franciscan friar in the convent of S. Francesco in  Bologna.

Life and Work
He was a pupil of Lucio Massari, and made miniature copies from the works of Correggio, Titian, and Guido Reni among others, which were collected in the cabinet of his patron, Alfonso IV of Modena. He also etched a few plates after Parmigianino, Reni, and an original Holy Family, with St. John and St. Elisabeth, (1631). He died at Bologna.

References

17th-century Italian painters
Italian male painters
Painters from Bologna
Italian Baroque painters
1601 births
1659 deaths
Catholic painters